Basilian may refer to a number of groups who are followers of Saint Basil the Great and specifically to:

 Basilian monks (founded c. 356), monks who follow the rule of Saint Basil the Great, in modern use refers to monks of Eastern Catholic Churches
 Order of Saint Basil the Great or Basilian Order of Saint Josaphat (founded c. 1631), a Ukrainian Greek Catholic monastic order
 Basilian Salvatorian Order (founded 1683), a religious order of the Melkite Greek Catholic Church
 Basilian Chouerite Order of Saint John the Baptist (founded 1696), a religious order of the Melkite Greek Catholic Church
 Basilian Aleppian Order (founded 1697), a religious order of the Melkite Greek Catholic Church
 Basilian Chouerite Sisters (founded 1737), a religious order of the Melkite Greek Catholic Church
 Basilian Aleppian Sisters (founded 1740), a religious order of the Melkite Greek Catholic Church
 Congregation of St. Basil (founded 1822), a Roman Catholic order of priests now active in the Americas